Hernando de Aragón y de Gurrea, OCist (25 July 1498 – 29 January 1575), Archbishop of Zaragoza and Lieutenant General of Aragon, was an Aragonese humanist and historian.

Family 

Born in Zaragoza, Aragón was the second illegitimate son of Alonso de Aragón, then Archbishop of Zaragoza and future Archbishop of Valencia and Lieutenant General of Aragon. His father was an illegitimate son of King Ferdinand II of Aragon, while his mother was Ana de Gurrea. Through his grandfather he was first-half cousins with Charles V, Holy Roman Emperor his wife Isabella of Portugal, Mary I of England, John III of Portugal and Ferdinand I, Holy Roman Emperor.

The Archbishop had a son by María Jiménez Cerdán, Pedro, Lord of Ballobar.

Clerical career 

Although he was meant to pursue a military career, he chose to enter the Cistercian Monastery of Piedra. He was ordained in 1524. His first cousin, King Charles I of Aragon, made him Abbot of Veruela Abbey. On 21 May 1539, the King made him Archbishop of Zaragoza, a position previously held by his father and elder brother Juan. He was consecrated on 9 November 1539.

King Charles I made him his deputy in the Aragonese Cortes in 1524, while Charles' son and successor, King Philip II, made him Lieutenant General of Aragon in 1566.

Patron 

The Archbishop was a great patron and promoter of art in Aragon. He was especially interested in La Seo Cathedral, where he had two chapels built on his own expense, on the condition that he and his mother are interred there together. He also came up with the idea of constructing Lonja de Zaragoza, ordered the construction of the Charterhouse of Aula Dei.

Aragón also functioned as the Official Chronicler of Aragon and wrote "History of the Kings of Aragon" (Spanish: Historia de los Reyes de Aragón).

He was buried in La Seo Cathedral along with his mother.

Ancestry

|-

Archbishops of Zaragoza
Hernando
Viceroys of Aragon
16th-century Spanish historians
1498 births
1575 deaths